Grzegorz Ciastek (born 28 April 1955) is a Polish gymnast. He competed in eight events at the 1976 Summer Olympics.

References

1955 births
Living people
Polish male artistic gymnasts
Olympic gymnasts of Poland
Gymnasts at the 1976 Summer Olympics
Gymnasts from Warsaw